Excalibur Almaz was a private spaceflight company which planned to provide a variety of deep space crewed exploration missions, micro-gravity science, and payload delivery. EA also aimed to offer Low Earth Orbit cargo and crew delivery and return.

, plans, design and flight safety reviews were planned for 2015.
According to a 2012 interview with Art Dula, the chairman of Excalibur Almaz, the Excalibur Almaz capsule was supposedly at a "very high level of technical readiness" and could be flown within two to three years. The main issue of the first manned flight of the Excalibur Almaz capsule was regulatory, according to Dula, as the VA capsule had already completed nine unmanned test flights during the Almaz program, all of which were successful.
The company had entered into an unfunded Space Act Agreement with NASA as part of the Commercial Crew Development Round 2 (CCDev2) activities in 2011 but was not selected to receive funding under any phases of it.

History
In 2009, Excalibur Almaz hoped to begin flights by 2012 with revenue flights starting as early as 2013.

, Excalibur Almaz updated its mission service offerings to include lunar and deep space capabilities. Based on independent market studies, these missions beyond Low Earth Orbit will provide the best business opportunity for commercial space transportation companies. Because of these more ambitious service offerings, Excalibur Almaz had pushed back its first launch to 2015.

In June 2012, Excalibur Almaz signed an agreement with XCOR Aerospace for suborbital familiarisation and flight training services.

In March 2016, plans were announced to have the equipment converted into an educational exhibit, owing to lack of funds.

Company
Excalibur Almaz was based in Douglas, Isle of Man, with offices in Houston, Los Angeles, Moscow, and Tokyo.

In October 2011, NASA signed an unfunded Space Act Agreement for work related to the Commercial Crew Development program.  Details have not yet been released.  In July 2012, Excalibur Almaz Inc. (EAI) successfully completed its Commercial Crew Development Round 2 (CCDev2) partnership with NASA's Commercial Crew Program.

Jonathan Clark, NASA flight surgeon on six Space Shuttle missions—and whose wife, Laurel Clark, died in the Space Shuttle Columbia disaster on shuttle mission STS-107—is a consultant on space suit and crew biological environment design for Excalibur Almaz.

Operations

Spacecraft

Excalibur Almaz was designing a spacecraft based on the VA capsule hull from the TKS spacecraft. The VA is a space capsule from the Soviet space program, originally designed for the military Almaz space station program. The needed development of propulsion systems for the VA capsule was reportedly delegated to a then undisclosed European organisation as early as 2009. While the needed service module for an Excalibur Almaz capsule would have superficially resemble the FGB of the TKS spacecraft, it is based on Astrium's ATV design according to Art Dula, the chairman of Excalibur Almaz.

The potential Excalibur Almaz stations was to use two hulls from the Almaz space station program. The company's Soviet-era spacecraft were moved from Russia to Excalibur Almaz facilities on the Isle of Man in early 2011.  EA "planned to use the modules to provide extra room and supplies for the tourists and researchers it hoped to ferry into space." Excalibur Almaz's two Salyut-class 29-ton space stations, each with a capacity of 95 cubic meters will serve as the heart of its lunar and deep space capabilities. The Soviet-era electronics have been completely gutted and supposedly replaced with modern avionics supplied from an unnamed company.

By using modernised, tried-and-tested equipment rather than developing technology from scratch, the project was reportedly saving around $2 billion in development costs. The Russian Proton rocket, launched from the Baikonur Cosmodrome in Kazakhstan, was intended to be used to launch one of the spacecraft into space, where it would have remained. Astronauts were to use the Excalibur Almaz RRVs to get to and from the spacecraft.

Training
Excalibur Almaz had established a 2012 agreement with XCOR Aerospace to provide a suite of suborbital flight experiences as training milestones in preparation for orbital and trans-lunar missions.

Space launch services
In 2010, Excalibur Almaz partnered with Space Launch Services (SLS) to finance Sea Launch's preparations to emerge from Chapter 11 with US$12 million of debtor-in-possession (DIP) financing to provide investment in a financial reorganisation of Sea Launch. SLS earlier provided $12.5 million of DIP funds to Sea Launch in December 2009.

Company's problems
A secondhand Soviet-era space capsule that launched into space twice was set to be sold in Belgium on 2014-05-07. The Russian VA (Vozvraschaemyi Apparat, return vehicle) crew and cargo spacecraft was offered by the Berlin-based Lempertz auction house at its newly opened gallery in Brussels. The capsule was said to be the first historic spacecraft to be put up for sale in Europe. The VA capsule was sold to Excalibur Almaz (EA), a British company that planned to reuse the Soviet artefacts to offer commercial spaceflight services. In total, EA acquired four VA capsules and two Almaz (Salyut) modules in hopes of flying the combined spacecraft as a crew and cargo transportation system to the Moon, the asteroids and deep space. The VA spacecraft being offered still bears the Excalibur Almaz name and logo, as well as the flags of Russia, the United Kingdom, the Isle of Man and the United States. It was sold to an anonymous bidder for 1 million euro.

In September 2013 Dula, J. Buckner Hightower and Excalibur Almaz Ltd. were brought to court under the charges of fraud of $300,000 for the planned asteroid mining project. The case ended with conciliation in January 2014.

In November 2014 Art Dula, Dula's law office associate Anat Friedman, his business partner J. Buckner Hightower, The Robert A. and Virginia Heinlein Prize Trust, Excalibur Limited, Excalibur Almaz Limited and Excalibur Almaz USA Inc were all sued by Japanese entrepreneur Takafumi Horie for fraud. The amount mentioned was $49 million, allegedly provided by Takafumi to run the company. It is alleged that some of the money was spent to buy Soviet hardware, which, as the businessman states, turned out to be "museum specimens". Some of the money was also transferred into Dula's own name. Other alleged irregularities included reducing Takafumi's shareholding percentage.

In March 2015 one of the two hulls of Soviet-built Almaz space stations, along with the remaining VA capsule, was shipped to the Isle of Man's seaport. The destination of the hardware remained unknown.

Sources
Siddiqi, Asif A., The Almaz Space Station Complex: A History. 1964–1992, part 1, JBIS, Vol 54, No 11/12, November/December 2001.
Excalibur Almaz Limited AAS Presentation, 16 November 2005
Dr. Jamie Floyd, Assessment of the Almaz Capsule for Space Station Assured Crew Return (ACRV), McDonnell Douglas Aerospace MDC 97W5151, January 1997.

References

External links
 Grahn, Sven.  The Almaz Space Station Complex 
 Wade, Mark. Almaz 
 Russian Space Web.  The Almaz Program 

Private spaceflight companies
Cancelled space stations
Tourism on Moon
Space programme of the United Kingdom
Companies of the Isle of Man
Technology companies established in 2005
Transport companies established in 2005
2005 establishments in the United Kingdom
Technology companies of England
Transport companies of England
Transport in the Isle of Man